Chester County Courthouse may refer to:

 1724 Chester Courthouse, listed on the National Register of Historic Places (NRHP)
Chester County Courthouse (Pennsylvania), listed on the NRHP
Chester County Courthouse (Tennessee), listed on the NRHP